Brad Walker (born 30 January 1998) is an English professional rugby league footballer who plays as a  and  forward for the Keighley Cougars in the Betfred Championship. 

He previously played for the Widnes Vikings in the Super League and Betfred Championship, and spent time on loan from Widnes at the North Wales Crusaders in League 1. He played for Wakefield Trinity in the Betfred Super League and also spent time on loan from Wakefield at the Newcastle Thunder in Betfred League 1.

Background
He was born in Barrow-in-Furness, Cumbria, England.

Playing career
In 2017, he made his Widnes Super League début against the Castleford Tigers.

References

External links
Widnes Vikings profile
SL profile

1998 births
Living people
English rugby league players
Keighley Cougars players
Newcastle Thunder players
North Wales Crusaders players
Rugby league locks
Rugby league players from Barrow-in-Furness
Wakefield Trinity players
Widnes Vikings players